Idi Pellantara is a 1982 Indian Telugu-language film starring Chiranjeevi and Raadhika with Gollapudi Maruti Rao in a pivotal role. The film was directed by Vijay Bhaskar and produced by Kranthi Kumar. It was released on 16 July 1982.

Cast 
 Chiranjeevi
 Raadhika
 Gollapudi Maruti Rao

References

External links 
 

1982 films
Films scored by K. Chakravarthy
1980s Telugu-language films